Line A of the Rome Metro runs across the city from the north-west terminus of Battistini to the south-east terminus at Anagnina. It intersects with Line B at Termini and with Line C at San Giovanni. The line is marked orange on metro maps.

Normally very crowded, Line A is estimated to transport nearly half a million people daily.

History
In 1959, approval was granted for the construction of a second metropolitan railway line in Rome, from the area of Osteria del Curato to Prati, passing through the city centre and intersecting with the existing line (inaugurated in 1955) at Termini Station.

Work began in 1964 in the Tuscolana area and immediately ran into unexpected delays and difficulties, an example of which was the disruption caused to traffic in the south-east of Rome by the cut and cover method of digging. The work was suspended and resumed 5 years later, with tunnelling machines which, although helping to ease traffic problems, caused vibration damage to buildings.

Archaeological discoveries were frequent during the work, in particular in the area of Piazza della Repubblica, and required changes to the planning. The uncovered remains were put on show in protective glass display cases in Repubblica station. The tunnelling work and connected archaeological discoveries were portrayed in Federico Fellini's film Roma.

The line begun service in 1980, from Anagnina to Ottaviano and took the name of Line A, while the existing Termini-Laurentina line was called Line B. In the early 1990s, work began on an extension to Line A from Ottaviano to Battistini, which opened during 1999 and 2000.

Opening dates
 19 February 1980: Ottaviano – Cinecittà
 11 June 1980: Cinecittà – Anagnina
 29 May 1999: Ottaviano – Valle Aurelia
 1 January 2000: Valle Aurelia – Battistini

Rolling stock
The first rolling stock used on Line A was the MA100 series trains running in 4-car formation, later increased to 6 cars due to increased passenger demand.

In the late 1990s, the MA200 series began operation on Line A and was the first Rome Metro train type to use three-phase asynchronous motors with electronic drive as its traction system. The MA200 series was however prone to technical problems and was originally intended only for Line B before being transferred to Line A.

In January 2005, the MA100 and MA200 series began to be replaced by new design, air-conditioned S/300 trains, built by the Spanish company CAF (Construcciones y Auxiliar de Ferrocarriles), identified as MA300 series by ATAC, operator of the Rome Metro. Because of this the MA100 and MA200 series have been transferred to the Rome-Lido railway.

The S/300 trains today make up the larger share of Line A's rolling stock. They also are some of the first cars to feature automated announcements.

Station announcements

In the S/300 cars, upon leaving a station, the next stop is announced as well as which side of the train the doors will open on. Upon entering the next station, the name of the station and which side the doors will open on is repeated. Once the train stops, several beeps go off as the doors open. A higher pitch chime sounds before the doors close. The cycle then repeats.

For example, this is how the announcements play for a train stopping at Barberini:

Upon leaving either Spagna or Repubblica, the announcement plays:

"Prossima fermata: Barberini–Fontana di Trevi. Uscita lato destro." (Translation: "Next stop: Barberini–Trevi Fountain. Exit right side.")

Then when the train enters Barberini, the announcement plays:

"Barberini–Fontana di Trevi. Uscita lato destro." (Translation: "Barberini–Trevi Fountain. Exit right side.")

Accidents

On 17 October 2006, an accident caused the death of one person and injury to more than 100 others.

Possible extensions
Further extensions to Line A are being considered to the north, from Battistini to Torrevecchia Monastero (5 km and 5 stations).
The following stations are:
Quadrati Bologno,
Agghindare Ministerios,
Centrale,
Casal Wagnerio
and Torrevecchia Monastero.

Maps
 Rome Metro and Suburban railways
 Old Map of the plans for the Rome Metro

External links
 
 Romametropolitane (in Italian)
 Rome public transport site
 Urban Rail

Rome Metro lines
Railway lines opened in 1980
1980 establishments in Italy